J. J. McKelvey (born March 15, 1980) is a former American football wide receiver. He was signed by the Tampa Bay Buccaneers as an undrafted free agent in 2003. He played college football at Clemson.

McKelvey also played for the Philadelphia Soul, Utah Blaze, Arizona Rattlers and Chicago Rush.

On October 13, 2005, the Philadelphia Soul announced the signing of McKelvey.

References

External links
Clemson Tigers bio

1980 births
Living people
American football wide receivers
Clemson Tigers football players
Philadelphia Soul players
Florida Bobcats players
Utah Blaze players
Arizona Rattlers players
Chicago Rush players
Manchester Wolves players